Harmeet Singh Bansal (born 9 October 1987) is an Indian cricketer. He represents Punjab as a right arm medium bowler.

He was associated with the Deccan Chargers from 2009 to 2011. He was part of the Deccan Chargers team that won IPL 2009. In the players auction for IPL 2012, he was bought by Kings XI Punjab. In IPL 2012 he played 7 matches and got only 6 wickets.

References

External links
 Harmeet Singh | Cricket Players and Officials | ESPN Cricinfo

1987 births
Indian cricketers
Living people
Deccan Chargers cricketers
Punjab Kings cricketers
Punjab, India cricketers
People from Jodhpur